In Greek mythology and history, Promachus (Ancient Greek: Πρόμαχος; English translation: "who leads in battle" or "champion") is a name that refers to several different people.

Mythology

Promachus, son of Aeson. King of Iolcus, and Alcimede or Amphinome. He was killed by Pelias along with his father, while his older brother, Jason, searched for the Golden Fleece.
Promachus, son of Parthenopaeus and one of the Epigoni, who attacked the city of Thebes to avenge their fathers, the Seven against Thebes, who died attempting the same thing. Promachus died in the attack, and was buried nearby at Teumessus.
Promachus, son of Alegenor, from Boeotia, a Greek warrior in the Iliad who was killed by Acamas.
Promachus, son of Heracles and Psophis, brother of Echephron.
Promachus, one of the Suitors of Penelope from Ithaca along with 11 other wooers. He, with the other suitors, was killed by Odysseus with the assistance of Eumaeus, Philoetius, and Telemachus.
Promachus of Cnossus, who was desperate to win the love of the handsome youth Leucocomas. He risked his life facing various challenges to win notable prizes, but Leucocomas remained indifferent. Finally, Promachus won a famous helmet for a prize and put it on the head of another youth in the presence of Leucocomas: the latter was overcome with jealousy and stabbed himself.
The name Promachus, "the champion", also occurs as a surname of Athena in Athens, Heracles at Thebes, and of Hermes at Tanagra.

History

Promachus of Macedon, a common soldier who died of alcohol abuse.
Promachus of Pellene, a pankration champion.

Other uses
Promachus (genus), a genus of flies
173117 Promachus, Jupiter Trojan asteroid

Notes

References 

 Apollodorus, The Library with an English Translation by Sir James George Frazer, F.B.A., F.R.S. in 2 Volumes, Cambridge, MA, Harvard University Press; London, William Heinemann Ltd. 1921. ISBN 0-674-99135-4. Online version at the Perseus Digital Library. Greek text available from the same website.
 Conon, Fifty Narrations, surviving as one-paragraph summaries in the Bibliotheca (Library) of Photius, Patriarch of Constantinople translated from the Greek by Brady Kiesling. Online version at the Topos Text Project.
Diodorus Siculus, The Library of History translated by Charles Henry Oldfather. Twelve volumes. Loeb Classical Library. Cambridge, Massachusetts: Harvard University Press; London: William Heinemann, Ltd. 1989. Vol. 3. Books 4.59–8. Online version at Bill Thayer's Web Site
 Diodorus Siculus, Bibliotheca Historica. Vol 1-2. Immanel Bekker. Ludwig Dindorf. Friedrich Vogel. in aedibus B. G. Teubneri. Leipzig. 1888–1890. Greek text available at the Perseus Digital Library.
 Hard, Robin, The Routledge Handbook of Greek Mythology: Based on H.J. Rose's "Handbook of Greek Mythology", Psychology Press, 2004, . Google Books.
Homer, The Iliad with an English Translation by A.T. Murray, Ph.D. in two volumes. Cambridge, MA., Harvard University Press; London, William Heinemann, Ltd. 1924. . Online version at the Perseus Digital Library.
Homer, Homeri Opera in five volumes. Oxford, Oxford University Press. 1920. . Greek text available at the Perseus Digital Library.
Pausanias, Description of Greece with an English Translation by W.H.S. Jones, Litt.D., and H.A. Ormerod, M.A., in 4 Volumes. Cambridge, MA, Harvard University Press; London, William Heinemann Ltd. 1918. . Online version at the Perseus Digital Library
 Pausanias, Graeciae Descriptio. 3 vols. Leipzig, Teubner. 1903.  Greek text available at the Perseus Digital Library.

Family of Athamas
Epigoni
Children of Heracles
Heracleidae
Achaeans (Homer)
People of the Trojan War
Suitors of Penelope
Ithacan characters in Greek mythology
Characters from Iolcus
Epithets of Heracles